Malta  participated in the Eurovision Song Contest 2022 in Turin, Italy. Emma Muscat was selected as the Maltese representative via the national final Malta Eurovision Song Contest 2022, where she competed with the song "Out of Sight", but on 14 March 2022 it was announced Muscat would perform the song "I Am What I Am" instead.

Malta was drawn to compete in the second semi-final of the Eurovision Song Contest which took place on 12 May 2022. Performing during the show in position 6, "I Am What I Am" was not announced among the top 10 entries of the second semi-final and therefore did not qualify to compete in the final. It was later revealed that Malta placed 16th out of the 18 participating countries in the semi-final with 47 points.

Background 

Prior to the 2022 contest, Malta has participated in the Eurovision Song Contest thirty-three times since its first entry in 1971. Malta briefly competed in the Eurovision Song Contest in the 1970s before withdrawing for sixteen years. The country had competed in every contest between their return in 1991, and 2022.

The Maltese national broadcaster, Public Broadcasting Services (PBS), broadcast the event within Malta and organised the selection process for the nation's entry. PBS confirmed their intentions to participate at the 2022 contest on 21 June 2021. Malta used the talent show format X Factor Malta for their 2019 and 2020 participations which resulted in the selection of a winning performer that would subsequently be given an internally selected song to perform at Eurovision. However PBS announced that they would select their 2022 entry through a national final procedure, a method that was last used in 2018.

Before Eurovision

Malta Eurovision Song Contest 2022 
Malta Eurovision Song Contest 2022 was the national final format developed by PBS to select the Maltese entry for the Eurovision Song Contest 2022. The competition consisted of three shows held between 17 and 19 February 2022 at the Malta Fairs & Conventions Centre in Ta' Qali, Attard. All shows were hosted by Stephanie Spiteri, Quinton Scerri, Ron Briffa, Ryan and Josmar , and broadcast on Television Malta (TVM) as well on the broadcaster's website tvm.com.mt. The semi-final and special show were watched by 300 thousand viewers combined, while the final was watched by 226 thousand viewers, including online and social media streams.

Format 
The competition consisted of twenty songs competing in the semi-final on 17 February 2022 where the top sixteen entries with the addition of a wildcard qualified to compete in the final on 19 February 2022. The special show took place on 18 February 2022 where the first sixteen qualifiers were announced. Six judges evaluated the songs during the shows and each judge had an equal stake in the final result. The seventh set of votes were the results of the public televote and announced prior to the final on 19 February, which had a weighting equal to the votes of a single judge. The wildcard was selected by an additional televote following the special evening, while the six members of the jury that evaluated the entries during both the semi-final and final consisted of TVM representatives: Carlo Borg Bonaci, Antonio Belli, Maria Muscat, Antoine Faure, Nadine Muscat and Ruth Amaira.

Competing entries 
Artists and composers were able to submit their entries between 15 October 2021 and 15 December 2021. Songwriters from any nationality were able to submit songs as long as the artist were Maltese or possessed Maltese citizenship. Artists were able to submit as many songs as they wished, however, they could only compete with a maximum of one in the semi-final. 2021 Maltese Eurovision entrant Destiny was unable to compete due to a rule that prevented the previous entrant from competing in the following contest. The twenty-two songs selected to compete in the semi-final were announced on 29 December 2021. Among the competing acts were former Eurovision entrants Richard Edwards who represented Malta in the 2014 contest as part of the group Firelight and Jessika Muscat who represented San Marino in the 2018 contest. Francesca Sciberras represented Malta in the Junior Eurovision Song Contest 2009 and Nicole Azzopardi represented Malta in the Junior Eurovision Song Contest 2010.

Semi-final 
The semi-final took place on 17 February 2022. The running order for the semi-final was announced on 6 February 2022. Twenty-two songs competed for seventeen qualifying spots in the final, one of them being a wildcard among the six songs that originally failed to qualify from the semi-final, awarded to Jessika with the song "Kaleidoscope".

Special show 
The special show, which celebrated Malta's 50th Anniversary since their first participation in the Eurovision Song Contest, took place on 18 February 2022. The twenty-two contestants performed former Maltese Eurovision songs in duets with their respective original artists. The show was opened with a guest performance from the Analise Dance Studio, and featured a tribute to 1994 Maltese Eurovision entrant Christopher Scicluna who had passed away the same day.

Final 
The final took place on 19 February 2022. The seventeen entries that qualified from the semi-final were performed again and the votes of a six-member jury panel (6/7) and the results of proportional public televoting (1/7) determined the winner. The show was opened with a guest performance from the Analise Dance Studio, while the interval act featured performances by Malta's Junior Eurovision Song Contest 2015 winner and 2021 Maltese Eurovision entrant Destiny Chukunyere, 2021 Maltese Junior Eurovision entrant Ike and Kaya, and the Concept of Movement dance troupe. After the votes from the jury panel and televote were combined, "Out of Sight" performed by Emma Muscat was the winner.

Song selection 
Following Muscat's win at Malta Eurovision Song Contest 2022, rumours began to surface that she would perform a song other than "Out of Sight" at the Eurovision Song Contest. In an interview with the Danish public broadcaster, producer Anders Fredslund revealed that PBS had begun the search for a new Eurovision entry for Emma Muscat the day after her victory in the Maltese selection. Fredslund explained that he had been informed the representative has been chosen, but the broadcaster was looking for potential songs to represent it in the contest. The then company sent a number of songs to PBS, from which two were selected to be recorded as demos, with the broadcaster subsequently selecting "I Am What I Am", written by Dino Medanhodžić, Emma Musca, Julie Aagaard and Stine Kinck. "I Am What I Am" was released on 14 March 2022, and on the same day, the song was confirmed to replace "Out of Sight" as Muscat's entry at Eurovision.

Promotion 
A music video for "I Am What I Am" premiered on the official YouTube channel of the Eurovision Song Contest on 14 March 2022. Prior to the contest, Muscat made appearances across Europe to specifically promote "I Am What I Am" as the Maltese Eurovision entry. She first performed at the Barcelona Eurovision Party, which was held on 26 March 2022 at Barcelona's Sala Apolo, and later performed at the London Eurovision Party, which was held on 3 April 2022 at London's Hard Rock Hotel venue. On 7 April, she performed during the Israel Calling event held at the Menora Mivtachim Arena in Tel Aviv, Israel, and Eurovision in Concert at Amsterdam's AFAS Live on 9 April. On 16 April, she performed at the PrePartyES which took place in Madrid's Sala La Riviera. In addition to her international appearances, Emma Muscat recorded her 'live-on-tape' performance in Sofia, Bulgaria on 19 March. This would have been used in the event that she was unable to travel to Turin, or subjected to quarantine on arrival.

At Eurovision

According to Eurovision rules, all nations with the exceptions of the host country and the "Big Five" (France, Germany, Italy, Spain and the United Kingdom) are required to qualify from one of two semi-finals in order to compete for the final; the top ten countries from each semi-final progress to the final. The European Broadcasting Union (EBU) split up the competing countries into six different pots based on voting patterns from previous contests, with countries with favourable voting histories put into the same pot. On 25 January 2022, an allocation draw was held which placed each country into one of the two semi-finals, as well as which half of the show they would perform in. Malta has been placed into the second semi-final, to be held on 12 May 2022, and scheduled to perform in the first half of the show.

Once all the competing songs for the 2022 contest had been released, the running order for the semi-finals was decided by the shows' producers rather than through another draw, so that similar songs were not placed next to each other.

Malta failed to qualify to the final, finishing in 16th place with 47 points, in addition Muscat is the first ever for Malta who also was a non qualifier after the jury votes.

Voting

Points awarded to Malta

Points awarded by Malta

Detailed voting results
The following members comprised the Maltese jury:
 Antoine Faure
 Claudia Faniello
 Daniel D'Anastasi
 Gaia Cauchi
 Maria Abdilla

Notes

References 

2022
Countries in the Eurovision Song Contest 2022
Eurovision